Illbient is a genre of electronic music and an art movement that originated among hip hop-influenced artists from Williamsburg, New York City around 1994. DJ Olive, and DJ Spooky,  pioneers of the genre, have both claimed to have coined the term. The word "illbient" combines the hip hop slang term "ill" (a positive expression: bad meaning good) and "ambient".

Though there are many individualistic variants of illbient, the music is characterized by dub- and industrial-influenced layering of soundscapes, hip hop-influenced use of samples and a progressive approach to beat programming that encompasses all genres of world groove and electronic music.  Illbient often uses beats more than purely ambient music (or dark ambient), and often includes loops in the recordings.

Besides DJ Olive, other notable names and acts that were part of the original illbient scene included DJ Spooky, Raz Mesinai (Sub Dub, Badawi), We™ (which was the joint project of DJ Olive, Lloop, and Once 11), Byzar, Spectre and the artists that were released on his WordSound label around that time.

See also
 Soundlab

References

External links
Boston Phoenix article
3,500+ releases tagged as Illbient on Discogs

 
Ambient music
Trip hop